HMS Dover was a 38-gun troopship, previously the French corvette Bellona, launched at Venice in 1808. She was captured at Lissa in 1811. She served as a troopship and transport until circa 1819. She then became the flagship for the Admiral commanding the Leith station. She was used for harbour service from 1825, and was sold in 1836.

Corvette Bellona
Lieutenant de vaisseau Duodo commissioned Bellone in 1810. Between 22 February and 7 March 1810 she underwent coppering.

, which was under the command of Captain William Hoste, the commander of a British squadron, captured Bellona on 3 March 1811 at the Battle of Lissa (1811). Hoste reported that Bellona was under the command of M. Didon. Actually, Bellonas captain was Giuseppe Duodo, who was killed during the battle; Bellona had suffered some 70 casualties.

HMS Dover
Bellona arrived at Deptford in September. She was fitted as a troopship between March and July 1812 while at Deptford. Although a key reference states Dover was never commissioned, that appears incorrect. A.Y.Dray commissioned her in 1812 as a troopship. In September 1812 Lloyd's List reported that the frigate Dover had arrived at Portsmouth on 1 September from Anholt. On 13 January 1813 the "Dover frigate" arrived at Torbay, having escorted seven merchantmen from Portsmouth.

In 1813 Dover was in the Mediterranean. She then sailed to the North American station.

On 28 June 1813 Dover recaptured the schooner Harriet, A. Winterholt, master. She had been carrying oil and sealskins when she had been captured. The prize crew took her into Halifax, Nova Scotia.

On 30 June Dover captured the ship Liverpool Packet, S.Nicholas, master. The prize court in Halifax restored her to her owners. The report in Lloyd's List referred to Dover as the "Dover M[] [W].

At some point in 1813 Dover captured the brig Roscio, F.Jose Carva, master.

In August Dover was at Quebec. Forty-one and officers and men from Dover joined the British squadron on Lake Erie, arriving on 5 September.

The frigate Dover arrived at Deal from Quebec on 19 July 1814, and sailed for Portsmouth two days later.

Commander Robert Henley Rogers was appointed to Dover on 30 July 1814. Rogers was promoted to post-captain on 2 September 1816.

At the end of 1814, Dover took part in the Gulf Campaign as a troopship. Under the rules of prize-money, the troopship Dictator shared in the proceeds of the capture of the American vessels in the Battle of Lake Borgne on 14 December 1814.

On 29 May 1815 the A[] S[] Dover arrived at Portsmouth from Havana.

Post-war
On 16 April 1816 the Dover frigate sailed from Portsmouth for the West Indies. On 13 May she was at Madeira and the next day she sailed for Barbados, which she reached on 3 June.

Between September and November 1819 Dover was fitted for a guardship at Leith. Captain Arthur Batt Bingham took command of Dover on 25 September 1819. At the time she was serving as the flagship to Admiral Robert Otway. In 1820 she served as the flagship to Admiral Sir John P. Beresford. On 14 November 1821 command of Dover passed to Captain Samuel Chambers.

Between October 1824 and February 1825 Dover was at Deptford being fitted as a receiving ship.

Between June and July 1831 Dover was at Deptford for the quarantine service.

Fate 
Dover was sold at Deptford on 21 January 1836 for £1000.

Notes

Citations

References
 
 
 
 

 
  
 

1807 ships
Captured ships
Ships of the Royal Navy